Burr Oak is an unincorporated community in Noble Township, Noble County, in the U.S. state of Indiana.

History
A post office was established at Burr Oak in 1848, but was soon discontinued, in 1850. The community probably took its name from the nearby Burr Oak Schoolhouse, built in 1840.

Geography

References

Unincorporated communities in Noble County, Indiana
Unincorporated communities in Indiana